Simple is the debut solo album by Oxford singer-songwriter Andy Yorke, released in 2008.

Track listing
 "Simple" - 3:51
 "Found the Road" - 3:13
 "Twist of the Knife" - 3:34
 "Rise and Fall" - 3:36
 "Diamant" - 3:50
 "One in a Million" - 4:16
 "Always by Your Side" - 3:17
 "Let It Be True" - 3:54
 "Mathilda" - 3:48
 "Lay Down" - 4:14
 "Surrender" - 3:59
 "Ode to a Friend" - 3:37

2008 debut albums